Washington Market Park is an urban park located in the TriBeCa neighborhood of Lower Manhattan in New York City. The park also has community gardens and a large playground and hosts many community events.

History
The city of New York proposed the construction of a municipal parking lot on a disused dump site located just south of the Independence Plaza apartments in the late 1970s. Residents of TriBeCa, including former New York City councilwoman Kathryn E. Freed, protested the planned parking lot and campaigned for a new city park in their neighborhood. At the time, the tiny, triangular Duane Park was one of the few green spaces in TriBeCa. The activists successfully persuaded officials to build a park, which was called Washington Market Park, instead of the parking lot.

In the late 1970s, a federally-funded Community Block Development Grant was obtained from the city and used to design and build the existing park. Lee Weintraub, then an architect with the city's Housing and Development Administration (HDA), was assigned to design the park. A not-for-profit corporation, Washington Market Community Park, Inc, was created in 1978 to oversee the park, to be run by a Board of Directors elected by the community.

Washington Market Park opened in April 1983. It is named for the former Washington Market, which functioned as New York City's most important wholesale produce market, reaching its peak between 1880 and 1910. New York City tore down the nearby, former Washington Market buildings in the 1960s when the wholesale produce industry relocated to Hunts Point in the Bronx.

In 2003, Mayor Michael Bloomberg included Washington Market Park as one of twelve parks in Lower Manhattan which received a combined $25 million in upgrades from the Lower Manhattan Development Corporation.

References

External links
The Friends of Washington Market Park
The Tribeca Trib: Sod Will Let Washington Market Park Lawn Open a Month Early
Friends of Washington Market Park
The Tribeca Trib: "From Dump to  Jewel: How Washington Market Park Took Root in Tribeca"

Parks in Manhattan
Tribeca